A prison commissary or canteen is a store within a correctional facility, from which inmates may purchase products such as hygiene items, snacks, writing instruments, etc. Typically inmates are not allowed to possess cash; instead, they make purchases through an account with funds from money contributed by friends, family members, etc., or earned as wages. Typically, prisons set a maximum limit of funds that can be spent by each inmate on commissary.

Items used as currency 
Certain items tend to be used as currency by inmates. Cigarettes were a classic medium of exchange, but in the wake of prison tobacco bans, a number of other prison commissary items have taken precedence. These include postage stamps and instant ramen noodles, which is also increasingly popular as a medium of exchange due to its versatility in prisons as food and its relative abundance. In some prisons, packets of mackerel fish or "macks" has also taken prominence as a currency, as it is priced closely with one US Dollar, and maintains stability by virtue of being rarely consumed.

Popular items 
Instant ramen noodles—often called "soups" in prison—are a popular item due to the often bland nature of prison food, the durability of common ramen noodle packages, and the uniformity or fungibility based on how one "soup" can easily be exchanged for another or multiple can be exchanged for other goods or services between prisoners in an illicit prison economy.

As prison budgets are cut in the US, ramen has become a popular commodity to supplement food needs. Packets of mackerel are another such item. These ingredients are often used by inmates to prepare meals, colloquially called "spreads".

In both the United States and United Kingdom, electronic cigarettes are available in a small amount of jails.

History 
In 1930, the U.S. Department of Justice authorized and established a commissary at each federal institution.

Operation 
Some prison commissaries are staffed by government employees and inmates, while others have been completely privatized. Significant price markups are common in prison commissaries, although some prison systems set maximum markups; for instance, the Delaware Department of Correction has a 20% maximum markup. $100 million in purchases were made from Texas' prison system alone in 2009. Prison commissary is a privilege that is often taken away for infractions.

See also

 Prison food

References

Further reading

Penal system in the United States
Retail markets in the United States

fr:Cantine#Cantine de prison